AC Latsia Nicosia is a women's handball club from Latsia in Cyprus. AC Latsia competes in the A1 Andrón.

Titles 
 A1 Andrón
 Winners (12) : 2000, 2004, 2005, 2006, 2010, 2012, 2013, 2015, 2016
 Cyprus Handball Cup
 Winners (7) : 1996, 1998, 1999, 2005, 2010, 2012, 2013

European record

Team

Current squad 

Squad for the 2016–17 season

Goalkeepers
  Natasa Koliantri
  Virginija Skucaite
  Antria Taki

Wingers
RW
  Marianna Charalambous
  Marilena Solea
LW
  Andjela Dimitrijevic
  Vaso Ioannou
  Alexandra Konstantinidou
Line players
  Elisabet Ellina
  Christina Georgiou

Back players
LB
  Paraskevi Kasapi
  Rena Tsangari
  Elena Vrahimi
CB
  Hermes Christodoulou
  Malvina Elia
  Irene Kasapi
  Vitaliya Lebelionyte
RB
  Olga Manora
  Victoria Svetlinova

External links
 
 EHF Club profile

Cypriot handball clubs
Nicosia District